The following highways are numbered 876:

United States